House of Flowers may refer to:
 House of Flowers (mausoleum)
 House of Flowers (musical), a 1954 Broadway musical
 The House of Flowers (TV series), a 2018 Mexican Netflix series
 Casa de las Flores or House of Flowers, an historic monument in Chamberí, Madrid
 "House of Flowers", a short story by Truman Capote